Tian Thala (?-1696) was the thirtieth king of Lan Xang between 1690(?) and 1695 (according to some sources he reigned only for 6 months in 1694 or 1695). His reigning title was Samdach Brhat Chao Devaniasena Chandralaya Raja Sri Sadhana Kanayudha.
 
He was from a distinguished noble family, unconnected to the Royal Family, he rose in the administration and was appointed to the position of Prime Minister with the title of Phya Muang Chandra by King Sourigna Vongsa.

He seized the throne on the death of the King Sourigna Vongsa in 1690, strengthening his position to a degree by marrying, ~1694, his younger daughter Princess Suman… Kumari. However, he was unpopular with the people and the principal nobles, who never fully accepted his pretensions to the throne.

He was deposed in 1695 by Nan Tharat, the Governor of Nakhone, and future Lan Xang king.

References 

Kings of Lan Xang
17th-century Laotian people
17th-century monarchs in Asia